Coelorinchus asteroides is a species of rattail. This is a deep-water fish found in the waters around Taiwan and southern Japan.

This species grows to a length of about 40 cm. It can be distinguished by its short, broad snout with a sharp rostral spine, conical premaxillary teeth, large, hexagonal, deciduous body scales and short bioluminescent organ in front of the anal fin.

References
A new species, Caelorinchus sheni, and 19 new records of grenadiers (Pisces: Gadiformes: Macrouridae) from Taiwan - CHIOU Mei-Luen ; SHAO Kwang-Tsao ; IWAMOTO Tomio

Macrouridae
Taxa named by Osamu Okamura
Fish described in 1963